Ramat HaHayal (lit. Soldiers Hill) is a northeastern neighborhood of Tel Aviv, Israel. Some high tech firms have research and development offices in Ramat HaHayal.

History
The neighborhood was established in 1949 to absorb demobilized soldiers after the 1948 Arab–Israeli War.

In 1954, Tel Aviv municipality donated a plot of land on Golan Street in Ramat HaHayal, dubbed "Shikun Shanghai", to members of the Jewish community from Shanghai, China, who left during the final stages of the Chinese Civil War.

Until 2010, it was widely assumed that the neighborhood had been named after the Jewish Brigade and its name was written in Hebrew  (lit. Jewish Brigade Heights), including in official municipal signs. The mistake was corrected by the municipality in 2010.

Many Israeli high-tech companies, among them Nisko, RAD Data Communications, BMC Software, Comverse Technology and Radwin are located in Ramat HaHayal. IBM maintains a research and development facility there. 
 The offices of the Israeli television broadcasting company Keshet are in Ramat HaHayal.  

In 2002, a monument dedicated to the Swedish diplomat Raoul Wallenberg was erected at the  intersection of Raoul Wallenberg and HaBarzel streets in Ramat HaHayal.

Assuta Medical Center, Israel's largest private medical provider, moved from central Tel Aviv to a new compound in Ramat HaHayal. The upscale facility, with 16 operating rooms, is located on HaBarzel Street.

Archaeology
In February 1997, archaeological excavations carried out at Ramat HaHayal found two wall foundations with abutting floor fragments, a pit, and ceramic and glass shards from the 8th–9th centuries BCE. A burial cave of the intermediate Bronze Age was cut into soft Kurkar stone, and several intact vessels were discovered belonging to the known types from the Yarkon River area.

See also
Economy of Israel
Science and technology in Israel
List of Israeli companies

References

Neighborhoods of Tel Aviv